The pampero is a burst of cold polar air from the west,  southwest, or south on the pampas in the south of Brazil, Argentina, Uruguay, Paraguay and Bolivia. This wind (often violently) picks up during the passage of a cold front of an active low passing by. It takes the form of a squall line and there is a marked drop in temperature after its death. The Pampero is most common in winter in the southern hemisphere (principally between May and August). During the summers in the region around Buenos Aires, the pampero storms are a welcome feature marking the end of long periods of high humidity and extreme heat.

Sources
 Wind names at ggweather.com. Accessed Jan 2009
 Penguin Dictionary of Geography, W G Moore, 1949

See also
 Minuano
 Zonda wind
 Pampas

Winds
Atmospheric dynamics 
Climate of Argentina
Climate of Uruguay
Spanish words and phrases